Christian Meyer (born 23 July 1975) is a German politician of the Alliance '90/The Greens who has been serving as State Minister for Environment, Energy and Climate Protection in the cabinet of Minister-President of Lower Saxony Stephan Weil since 2022.

Political career
Meyer was born in Holzminden, Lower Saxony. In the 2008 and 2013 state elections, he was elected to the Landtag of Lower Saxony.

From 2013 to 2017, Meyer served as State Minister of Food, Agriculture, Consumer Protection and State Development in the state government under Minister-President Stephan Weil. As one of the state’s representatives at the Bundesrat, he serves on the Commit­tee on the Envi­ronment, Na­ture Con­serva­tion and Nu­cle­ar Safe­ty.

Other activities
 German Federal Environmental Foundation (DBU), Member of the Board of Trustees (since 2023)
 Norddeutsche Landesbank, Chairman of the Advisory Board on Agricultural Credit Operations
 Greenpeace, Member
 World Wide Fund for Nature, Member

References

External links

 
 

1975 births
Living people
People from Holzminden
Alliance 90/The Greens politicians
Members of the Landtag of Lower Saxony
Ministers of the Lower Saxony State Government